Evans Agola was an Anglican bishop in Kenya during the last third of the twentieth century.

Agola was educated at St. Paul's University, Limuru. He was ordained deacon in 1943 and priest in 1945. He served the church at Ng'iya, Kitale, Kisumu and Ramba. He was Assistant Bishop of Maseno from 1965 to 1970; and Bishop of Maseno South from 1970 to 1973.

References

20th-century Anglican bishops of the Anglican Church of Kenya
St. Paul's University, Limuru alumni
Anglican bishops of Maseno
Academic staff of Great Lakes University of Kisumu
Year of birth missing
Anglican bishops of Maseno South